Ive Šubic (23 April 1922 – 29 December 1989) was a Slovene painter, graphic artists and illustrator.

Šubic was born in the village of Hotovlja near Poljane above Škofja Loka in 1922. He enrolled in the Zagreb Academy of Arts in 1940, but his studies were interrupted by the Second World War. He joined the partisans in 1941 and participated in the Battle of Dražgoše, the monument to which he later participated in designing. After the war he studied at the Academy of Fine Arts in Ljubljana under Gojmir Anton Kos and Božidar Jakac. He graduated in 1948. He is known for his paintings, linocuts and other prints, illustrations and murals. He died in Škofja Loka in 1989.

In 1968 he won the Prešeren Foundation Award for the exhibition of his art in the Škofja Loka Museum. In 1979 he won the Grand Prešeren Award for his creative achievements. He also won the Levstik Award for his illustrations five times, in 1949, 1951, 1967 (with Jože Ciuha), 1969 and 1971.

The Ive Šubic Art Colony, organized every year in Škofja Loka since 1997 is named after him.

Selected Illustrated Works

 Uporne Dražgoše (Dražgoše the Village That Rebelled), written by Ivo Zorman, 1978 
 Dolga pot (The Long Path), written by Kristina Brenk, 1973
 Kos rženega kruha (A Slice of Rye Bread), written by Ferdo Godina, 1971
 Mladost v džungli (Youth in the Jungle), written by Dhan Gopal Mukerji, 1969
 Tolminski punt (The Peasant Revolt in Tolmin), written by France Bevk, 1968
 Spomini na deda in druge zgodbe (Memories of Grandfather and Other Stories), written by Josip Jurčič, 1967
 Jugoslavija (Yugoslavia), written by France Planina, 1967
 Smeh skozi solze (Laughter Through Tears), written by France Bevk, 1959
 Kralj Matjaž reši svojo nevesto (King Matjaž Saves his Bride), written by Mile Klopčič, 1951
 Nejček (Nejček), written by Zoran Hudales, 1949

References

Slovenian male painters
Slovenian illustrators
1922 births
1989 deaths
People from the Municipality of Gorenja Vas-Poljane
Prešeren Award laureates
Levstik Award laureates
University of Ljubljana alumni
Academy of Fine Arts, University of Zagreb alumni
Yugoslav Partisans members
20th-century Slovenian painters
20th-century Slovenian male artists
Yugoslav painters